Wilson Park is a small community in northeast Baltimore, Maryland and one of the first African-American communities in the city.  Its bounded on the south by 43rd Street and the east by The Alameda. Two community associations serve the area:  the Kimberleigh Road Community Association and the Wilson Park Improvement Association. The homes range from large single-family homes to semi-detached and townhouses in a number of different styles. A majority of homes are owner-occupied.

Demographics
According to the 2000 US Census, 1,355 people live in Wilson Park with 97.8% African-American and .7% White. The median family income is $45,208. 86% of the houses are occupied and 78.5% of those are occupied by the home's owner.

Schools
Wilson Park has one public K-8 school: Guilford Elementary/Middle. There is one public elementary school:  Walter P. Carter Elementary.  The area is also served by Winston Middle School and Chinquapin Middle School. High school students generally attend nearby Mergenthaler Vocational Technical Senior High School, City or Lewis high schools.

History

Wilson Park was built north of Baltimore which expanded in the 1950s to include Wilson Park and beyond. Still itvis the first community, now in Baltimore, built solely for black people. It was developed by Harry Wilson, an African American who began building houses as early as 1917. In addition to some of the neighborhoods being culturally historic, several are architecturally significant.

In 1948, I was 5 when my parents moved into an Apartment Building on East Arlington Ave. (Now 43rd street) in order to teach (Psychology and Mathematics) at Morgan State. Other professors were Turpin (English), Taylor (Physics) and Lamb. At that time in Wilson Park,The Alameda was named Beauregard Ave. There was a wooden four room Elementary School, with two teachers (one of whom was the Principal), at the intersection of Beauregard Ave. And Cold Spring Land.

Wilson's family began to sell large tracts of land in the early 1950s to developers who built dozens of new homes and apartment buildings on Arlington Ave (now 43rd street), St. Georges Ave. and Coldspring Lane. Kimberleigh Road was created in 1953 as part of the development.  These homes were bought by a variety of upwardly mobile African-American families including those of steelworkers from the Sparrows Point Shipyard, postal workers, teachers and Morgan State College administrators. In 1954 my parents purchased three rowhouse homes on The Alameda for their parents and our family.

Government Representation

References
 

African-American history in Baltimore
Neighborhoods in Baltimore
Northeast Baltimore